The Ballymena Cowboy is the seventh comedy album released by the Northern Irish comedian and actor James Young.

The album cover has a picture taken by Stanley Matchett Young holding a lasso and dressed as a cowboy. Beside him, a woman is dressed as an Indian and holds a tomahawk. The back cover has a picture of Young taken in 1969 on a visit to Canada along with a silhouette of a scene from the Old West. In the picture, Young is seen sitting on a wagon with Sam, The Record Man.

Track listing

Side 1
 The Ballymena Cowboy – 3:52
 A Hairy Tale: 2:42
 There's a Lounge Bar in The Town – 2:26
 On Derry's Walls – 3:08
 Stormont Pudding – 2:09
 Bingo Crazy – 3:01

Side 2
 Boom – 1:49
 I'm A Private Detective – 1:46
 The Cherryvalley Debutramp – 2:50
 U.L.S.T.E.R. – 2:09
 Sixty Years From Now – 2:14
 A Party Political Broadcast – 4:52

Re-release
Emerald Music re-released the album in 2001. It was made available separately or in a boxset with The Very Best of James Young.

Re-release order
The re-release has the same tracks as the original but in a different order::
 The Ballymena Cowboy
 Boom
 There's a Lounge Bar in the Town
 On Derry's Walls
 Stormont Pudding
 Bingo Crazy
 A Hairy Tale
 I'm A Private Detective
 The Cherryvalley Debutramp
 U.L.S.T.E.R.
 Sixty Years From Now
 Party Political Broadcast

References

1970 albums
James Young (comedian) albums